Ropica exocentroides is a species of beetle in the family Cerambycidae. It was described by Pascoe in 1859. It is known from Australia.

References

exocentroides
Beetles described in 1859